Benedictus Antonius Maria "Dick" Coster (born 19 June 1946 in Leiden) is a sailor from the Netherlands. Since the Netherlands did boycott the Moscow Olympic Games Coster represented his National Olympic Committee at the 1980 Summer Olympics in Tallinn, USSR under the Dutch NOC flag. With Geert Bakker as helmsman and fellow crew member Steven Bakker, Coster took the 5th place in the Soling. During the 1976 Olympics Coster was substitute for the Dutch Soling team.

Dick Coster also represented The Netherlands during the 2008 Vintage Yachting Games in Medemblik as crew in the Soling with helmsman Steven Bakker and fellow crewmembers Sven Coster and Joost Houweling. The team took silver.

Sailing career
Coster sailed Solo before he picked up Olympic sailing. During the Olympic campaigns (2002–2012) of his sons (Sven Coster and Kalle Coster) Coster worked as their coach.

Professional life
Until his retirement Coster worked in the assurance business.

Controversy
Several countries did boycott the 1980 Summer Olympics, others like France did not go since they found the competition devaluated. As result only half of the expected fleet was present during the Olympic regattas.

Sources

External links
 
 
 

1946 births
Living people
Dutch male sailors (sport)
Solo class sailors
Olympic sailors of the Netherlands
Sailors at the 1980 Summer Olympics – Soling
Sailors at the 2008 Vintage Yachting Games
Sportspeople from Leiden